Selection Sixteen is the fourth studio album by English electronic musician Squarepusher, released on 8 November 1999 by Warp. According to the CD, the cover art is from a film called Acid Trayners 4, which seems to be different pictures of an oscilloscope. Throughout the album, the bass, hooked to an audio/midi converter, plays an important part in the composition of synth and drum parts.

Track listing

"Anti-Greylord Protection Scheme Prelude"
Most releases of Selection Sixteen include "Anti-Greylord Protection Scheme Prelude", which was originally released as a separate EP with a slightly different track order. "Ceephax Mix" was created by Squarepusher's brother, Andy Jenkinson, aka Ceephax Acid Crew.

On the original release, "Schizm Track #2 Mix" is the first track.
"8 Bit Mix #1" – 1:04
"8 Bit Mix #2" – 0:55
"Schizm Track #2 Mix" – 3:45
"Ceephax Mix" (remixed by Andy Jenkinson) – 6:02

References

Squarepusher albums
1999 albums
Warp (record label) albums